10 Brock Street is a contemporary sixteen story office building designed by WilkinsonEyre and located in a London, England, The building is part of a development called Regent's Place which is made up of eight buildings. The development was commissioned by British Land. The unique visual elements include geometric angled planes, luminescent facades and angled roofline.

Design 

The building has three different sections which produce three different roof lines. Each section appears to be a separate building. together and separate they take on a crystalline appearance. It is a 3 core design which s referred to as in the style of Renzo Piano.

The office building s part of the Regent's Place development, which is a 13-acre site for the British Land company. The site includes retail, and residential in a total of eight buildings. There are 20,000 people who either work or live at the site. The original commission in 2003 called for three buildings of staggered height, but the Financial crisis of 2007–2008 caused the construction plans to change. 10 Brock street became a single building with a larger footprint.

Materials 
The building materials which were used in the facade include: aluminum mesh, 80 different glass types and luminescent steel panels. The components of the facade make the building more energy efficient. Instead of an all-glass facade, 20% of the building's south side is insulated. On the east and west outer glass facades there is fritting in the glass. The fritting consists of dots which are baked the glass with paint. Inside the glass there is also fritting. Inside facing fritting has a silver color and facing out is a dark blue: these different fritting shades create a 3 dimensional appearance to the glass. The fritting also is a factor in sun-shading. There are long vertical sun shading fins that also assist in the sun-shading. The energy saving measures incorporated in the design have earned the building an BREEAM - excellent (Building Research Establishment Environmental Assessment Method) rating.

References 

2013 introductions
Office buildings in London
Buildings and structures completed in 2013